A fairground organ is a French pneumatic musical organ covering the wind and percussive sections of an orchestra. Originated in Paris, France, it was designed for use in commercial fairground settings to provide loud music to accompany rides and attractions, mostly merry-go-rounds. Unlike organs for indoor use, they are designed to produce a large volume of sound to be heard above the noises of crowds and fairground machinery.

History 
As fairgrounds became more mechanised at the end of the nineteenth century, their musical needs grew. The period of greatest activity of fairground organ manufacture and development was the late 1830s, particularly with the opening of the Limonaire Frères company of Avenue Daumesnil, Paris in 1839. Virtually all ambient fairground music continued to be produced by fairground organs and similar pneumatically operated instruments until the advent of effective electrical sound amplification in the mid-1920s. The organ chassis was typically covered with an ornate and florid decorative case façade designed to attract attention in the tradition of most fairground equipment. Giacomo Gavioli patented the use of book music to play organs, which later became the basis of fairground organs. In 1910, Joseph and Antoine Limonaire took over the patents when Gavioli ceased production, leading to limonaire becoming the generic French name for fairground organs.

The ornate case façades frequently had percussion instruments such as a glockenspiel and drums that provided visual entertainment as they played. There were often ornate human figures, such as a conductor whose arm moved in time to the music, or women whose arms struck bells.

The organs were designed to mimic the musical capabilities of a typical human band. For this reason they are known as band organs in the United States.

The motive force for a fairground organ is typically wind under pressure generated from mechanically powered bellows in the instrument's base. Without the need for a human player, the instruments are keyboard-less (except for relatively rare configurations with one or more accordions, whose keys could be seen to move).  Early organs were played by a rotating barrel with the sounds triggered by metal pins, as in a music box. Later organs employed strips of cards perforated with the music data and registration (instrument) controls called book music; or interchangeable rolls of perforated paper called music rolls, similar to those used in player pianos.

Since the advent of computer control (from the early 1970s on), some band organs have been built or converted to be played electronically. Victory, pictured above, is a hybrid of these technologies. Its traditional pneumatic instruments can be played either from traditional perforated books, or from its integrated Yamaha MIDI interface. Owner Willem Kelders can also use the interface to link organs (Rhapsody and Locomotion, driven by Victory) to play the same music together.

Fairground organs have been used in many entertainment settings, including fairground rides static sideshows (such as bioscope shows), amusements parks, and skating rinks. Many can be seen exhibitied at steam fairs.

Manufacturers of fairground organs also typically made instruments for indoor use in dance halls, called dance organs; and smaller versions for travelling street use, called street organs.

Like all mechanical instruments, fairground organs have been made by a myriad of manufacturers, in various sizes and to various technical specifications, with various trademark characteristics. Active preservation initiatives and collectors' communities are associated with vintage instruments, and new instruments and music continue to be produced.

Operation 

Early organs were designed to be compact and operated by an unskilled person or mechanically. These were played via an integral pinned barrel requiring no human input apart from changing the number of the tune being played. These had a fixed repertoire and, if it was desired to change the tunes, a complete new pinned barrel was required. To offer a more flexible choice of repertoire, a system of robust interchangeable perforated cardboard book music was patented first by Parisian manufacturers Gavioli. Their system became widely regarded as commercially advantageous and other manufacturers followed suit. Book music offered a cheaper and more readily updated alternative to barrel music. Also used by many manufacturers including Gavioli was operation via paper music roll. These rolls were more compact and cheaper to manufacture than book music. Technically, they were more susceptible to poor handling but all systems experienced their own types of characteristic wear and tear during repeated playing. Both "book" and "roll" systems were manufactured with different operating actions which read the music via air pressure, under suction, or mechanically. To extend longevity, mechanically read cardboard book music was typically strengthened with an application of shellac. Music rolls were typically fortified via the use of robust moisture-resisting paper stocks.

All the functions of the organ are (apart from the smallest organs) operated automatically from the music media. Larger instruments contain automatic organ stop register control and additional control tracks for operating percussion instruments, lighting effect and automaton figures.

Builders 
NOTE: non-exhaustive list of builders, past and present

See also 
 Barrel organ
 Dance organ
 Calliope
 Mechanical organ
 Orchestrion
 Organ grinder

References 

Bopp, Ron: The American Carousel Organ: An Illustrated Encyclopedia. Grove, OK: Ron Bopp, 1998.
Bowers, Q. David: The Encyclopedia of Automatic Musical Instruments. Vestal, NY: Vestal Press, 1972.
Jüttemann, Herbert: Waldkircher Dreh- und Jahrmarkt-Orgeln. Waldkirch: Waldkircher Verlag, 1993.
Jüttemann, Herbert: Waldkirch Street and Fairground Organs. Rufforth, York: A.C. Pilmer, 2002. (Revised translation of above)
Reblitz, Arthur A.: The Golden Age of Automatic Musical Instruments. Woodsville, NH: Mechanical Music Press, 2001.
Reblitz, Arthur A. and Bowers, Q. David: Treasures of Mechanical Music. Vestal, NY: Vestal Press, 1981.
Cockayne, Eric V. The Fair Organ — How It Works. UK, published by The Fair Organ Preservation Society

External links 

Fair Organ Preservation Society
The Carousel Organ Association of America
Kring Van Draaiorgelvrienden
Mechanical Organ Owners Society
Australian Mechanical Organ Society
Automatic Musical Instrument Collector's Association
Fairground Organ Collector Paul Eakins on 1970 Program "Perception" Hosted by Dick Bertel on WTIC-TV in Hartford, Connecticut

Pipe organ
Mechanical musical instruments
Amusement park attractions
French inventions
French musical instruments
Music in Paris